Ade (born  1970 in Crouch End, London) is a British actor. He played Tyrone, the getaway driver, in Snatch. Ade also works within the music and publishing industries.

He has also appeared in Casino Royale, The 51st State and Sugarhouse.

Filmography

References

External links
 Official website

Living people
1970s births

Year of birth uncertain
People from Crouch End
British male film actors
Male actors from London